Lucksta IF is a Swedish football club located in Lucksta in Sundsvall Municipality, Västernorrland County.

Background
Lucksta Idrottsförening were founded in 1920 and their first match was played on 26 September 1920 against Matfors IF's B-team.  The youth football section was first developed in the 1970s and the club currently serves over 150 young people.

Since their foundation Lucksta IF has participated mainly in the middle and lower divisions of the Swedish football league system.  In 2001 they were promoted to Division 3 Mellersta Norrland which was then the fourth tier of Swedish football.  However their stay at this level lasted only two seasons before they were relegated back to Division 4 Medelpad. The club in 2010 played in Division 3 Mellersta Norrland which is now the fifth tier of Swedish football. They have finished in a relegation position and for the 2011 season will again be back in Division 4. They play their home matches at the Sörforsvallen in Lucksta.

Lucksta IF are affiliated to the Medelpads Fotbollförbund.

Season to season

Attendances

In recent seasons Lucksta IF have had the following average attendances:

The attendance record for Lucksta IF was around 1,300 spectators for the match against IF Elfsborg for a cup match in April 2002.

Footnotes

External links
 Lucksta IF – Official website

Sport in Västernorrland County
Football clubs in Västernorrland County
Association football clubs established in 1920
1920 establishments in Sweden